Internet research is the practice of using Internet information, especially free information on the World Wide Web, or Internet-based resources (like Internet discussion forum) in research.

Internet research has had a profound impact on the way ideas are formed and knowledge is created. Common applications of Internet research include personal research on a particular subject (something mentioned on the news, a health problem, etc.), students doing research for academic projects and papers, and journalists and other writers researching stories.

Research is a broad term. Here, it is used to mean "looking something up (on the Web)". It includes any activity where a topic is identified, and an effort is made to actively gather information for the purpose of furthering understanding. It may include some post-collection activities, like reading the material, and analysis, such as of quality or synthesis to determine whether it should be read in-depth.

Through searches on the Internet, pages with some relation to a give topic can be visited and read, or be quickly found and gathered. In addition, the Web can be used to communicate with people with relevant interests and experience, such as experts, to learn their opinions and what they know. Communication tools used for this purpose on the Web include email (including mailing lists), online discussion forums (aka message boards, BBS's), and other personal communication facilities (instant messaging, IRC, newsgroups, etc.). can provide direct access to experts and other individuals with relevant interests and knowledge.

Internet research is distinct from library research (focusing on library-bound resources) and commercial database research (focusing on commercial databases). While many commercial databases are delivered through the Internet, and some libraries purchase access to library databases on behalf of their patrons, searching such databases is generally not considered part of “Internet research”. It should also be distinguished from scientific research (research following a defined and rigorous process) carried out on the Internet, from straightforward retrieving of details like a name or phone number, and from research about the Internet.

Internet research can provide quick, immediate, and worldwide access to information, although results may be affected by unrecognized bias, difficulties in verifying a writer's credentials (and therefore the accuracy or pertinence of the information obtained) and whether the searcher has sufficient skill to draw meaningful results from the abundance of material typically available. The first resources retrieved may not be the most suitable resources to answer a particular question. Popularity is often a factor used in structuring Internet search results but popular information is not always most correct or representative of the breadth of knowledge and opinion on a topic.

While conducting commercial research fosters a deep concern with costs, and library research fosters a concern with access, Internet research fosters a deep concern for quality, managing the abundance of information and with avoiding unintended bias. This is partly because Internet research occurs in a less mature information environment: an environment with less sophisticated / poorly communicated search skills and much less effort in organizing information. Library and commercial research has many search tactics and strategies unavailable on the Internet and the library and commercial environments invest more deeply in organizing and vetting their information.

Search tools

Search tools for finding information on the Internet include web search engines, the search engines on individual websites, the browsers' hotkey-activated feature for searching in the current page, meta search engines, web directories, and specialty search services.

Web search 

A Web search allows a user to enter a search query, in the form of keywords or a phrase, into either a search box or on a search form, and then finds matching results and displays them on the screen. The results are accessed from a database, using search algorithms that select web pages based on the location and frequency of keywords on them, along with the quality and number of external hyperlinks pointing at them. The database is supplied with data from a web crawler that follows the hyperlinks that connect webpages, and copies their content, records their URLs, and other data about the page along the way. The content is then indexed, to aid retrieval.

To view this information, a user enters their search query, in the form of keywords or a phrase, into a search box or search form. Then, the search engine uses its algorithms to query a database, selecting

Websites' search feature 

Websites often have a search engine of their own, for searching just the site's content, often displayed at the top of every page. For example, Wikipedia provides a search engine for exploring its content. A search engine within a website allows a user to focus on its content and find desired information with more precision than with a web search engine. It may also provide access to information on the website for which a web search engine does not.

Browsers' local search features 

Browsers typically provide separate input boxes to search history titles, bookmarks, and the currently displayed web page, though the latter only shows up when a hot key is pressed.

Browsers' search hot key 

Using a key combo (two or more keys pressed down at the same time), the user can search the current page displayed by the browser. This is especially useful for long articles.

Meta search engines 

A Meta search engine enables users to enter a search query once and it runs against multiple search engines simultaneously, creating a list of aggregated search results. Since no single search engine covers the entire web, a meta search engine can produce a more comprehensive search of the web. Most meta search engines automatically eliminate duplicate search results. However, meta search engines have a significant limitation because the most popular search engines, such as Google, are not included because of legal restrictions.

Web directories 

A Web directory organizes subjects in a hierarchical fashion that lets users investigate the breadth of a specific topic and drill down to find relevant links and content. Web directories can be assembled automatically by algorithms or handcrafted. Human-edited Web directories have the distinct advantage of higher quality and reliability, while those produced by algorithms can offer more comprehensive coverage. The scope of Web directories are generally broad, such as Curlie and The WWW Virtual Library, covering a wide range of subjects, while others focus on specific topics.

Specialty search tools 

Specialty search tools enable users to find information that conventional search engines and meta search engines cannot access because the content is stored in databases. In fact, the vast majority of information on the web is stored in databases that require users to go to a specific site and access it through a search form. Often, the content is generated dynamically. As a consequence, Web crawlers are unable to index this information. In a sense, this content is "hidden" from search engines, leading to the term invisible or deep Web. Specialty search tools have evolved to provide users with the means to quickly and easily find deep Web content. These specialty tools rely on advanced bot and intelligent agent technologies to search the deep Web and automatically generate specialty Web directories, such as the Virtual Private Library.

Website authorship 

When using the Internet for  research, countless websites appear for whatever search query is entered. Each of these sites has one or more authors or associated organizations. Who authored or sponsored a website is very important to the accuracy and reliability of the information presented on the website.

While it is very imperative that authorship be determined for every website during Internet research, who authored or sponsored a website is essential to culture when one cares about the accuracy and reliability of the information, bias, and/or web safety. For example, a website about civil rights that is authored by a member of an extremist group most likely will not contain accurate or unbiased information.

The author or sponsoring organization of a website may be found in several ways. Sometimes the author or organization can be found at the bottom of the website home page. Another way is by looking in the ‘Contact Us’ section of the website. It may be directly listed, determined from the email address, or by emailing and asking. If the author's name or sponsoring organization cannot be determined, one should question the trustworthiness of the website. If the author's name or sponsoring organization is found, a simple Internet search can provide information that can be used to determine if the website is reliable and unbiased.

Internet research software 

Internet research software captures information while performing Internet research. This information can then be organized in various ways included tagging and hierarchical trees. The goal is to collect information relevant to a specific research project in one place, so that it can be found and accessed again quickly.

These tools also allow captured content to be edited and annotated and some allow the ability to export to other formats. Other features common to outliners include the ability to use full text search which aids in quickly locating information and filters enable you to drill down to see only information relevant to a specific query. Captured and kept information also provides an additional backup, in case web pages and sites disappear or are inaccessible later.

See also 

 Digital researcher
 FUTON bias
 Inquisitive learning
 Internet Archive
 Internet as a source of prior art
 Internet Research (journal)
 Seventh Framework Programme
 Source evaluation
 Web literacy
 Reliable sources

References

External links

Research